Claudio Burtin (born 17 September 1962 in Rosario, Argentina) is an American entrepreneur, chemist, and race car driver. He is the founder of LINE-X truck bed liners and is credited with the original formulations trademarking LINE-X. Claudio was born in Argentina and moved to the US in the summer of 1963. He attended Our Lady of the Valley Catholic elementary school located in the Los Angeles school district in southern California. He began working for his father at Chemetics Systems Inc. in Compton, CA at the age of fifteen while attending Servite High School in Anaheim. He apprenticed polyurethane chemistry from his father Carlos Burtin, a licensed chemist.

Carlos Burtin, emigrated to the United States together with his wife Ana Maria, older brother J.B. and Claudio. Ana Maria, J.B. and Claudio joined his father to found the Burtin Corporation in 1982 in Santa Ana, California. The company developed and refined various types of polyurethanes. In 1994, Claudio Burtin became the president of Line-X, one of Burtin Corporation's divisions, where he was also the divisions Chief Technical Officer until 2005.

In an early part of his career, Burtin was selected as a specialist to design and write the insulation specification requirements for the Trident 3 series of Nuclear Missiles.  Burtin later developed LINE-X protective coatings and PAXCON. The first LINE-X truck was sprayed by Claudio Burtin in 1987.

PAXCON is one of the first "blast mitigation" products tested and approved by the U.S. Military for use on military installations. PAXCON was used to coat U.S. Government facilities including the Pentagon, post 9/11 attacks. Burtin's has registered three patents. After the sale of LINE-X to Graham Partners, Burtin founded Burtin Polymer Laboratories.

In addition to developing products, Claudio Burtin also launched FOAMETIX, a light density polyurethane foam that is designed for insulation use. Burtin has developed and trademarked an array of other polyurethane products and applications available on the market in both residential and commercial uses today.

Motorsports

Claudio Burtin is a team owner and driver of Burtin Racing with deep roots motorsports that started at a young age. Founded by Claudio, Burtin Racing is based in Adairsville, Georgia and is focused primarily on road racing in North America. Claudio has competed multiple road races, including a Porsche 997 GT3 in North American endurance racing events and the Trans Am Championship Series.

As team principal and racing driver, Claudio Burtin has been involved in sports car competition since 1982. In 1998, Burtin was the SCCA South East GT Champion. Burtin has also driven for the Woodhouse Racing Viper team in the SCCA Pro Racing World Challenge GT. Burtin's most recent win was in the 2020 Hoosier SCCA Super Tour GT1 Class in Sebring, FL where he was driving one of his Burtin Racing Camaros.

He made his debut in the Trans-Am Series at the Grand Prix of Long Beach. The Ford Mustang, entered by Mirage Motorsports, suffered gearbox problems and failed to finish. He ran another two races in the season. For 1994 Burtin only ran the Trans-Am race supporting the Grand Prix of Miami. Burtin continued to make sporadic Trans-Am appearances throughout the decade. In 2000 Burtin took a career-best fourth place in the streets of Long Beach. He repeated this feat the following year. For the 2002 Trans-Am season Burtin switched from a Ford Mustang to a Panoz Esperante. The racing driver returned to the Ford the following season.

Burtin Racing was sponsored by LINE-X Protective Coatings until 2005. Afterwards, Burtin joined the growing SCCA World Challenge for 2006 in a Chevrolet Corvette C6. From 2006 Burtin Racing has been sponsored by FOAMETIX throughout its racing brand.

In conjunction with Goldcrest Motorsports, Burtin Racing has competed in seven consecutive Daytona 24-Hour events. In 2008 Burtin started his season in the 24 Hours of Daytona with The Racer's Group. In 2010, with Alex Job Racing, Burtin finished nineteenth overall. Each of the 24 Hours of Daytona races Burtin teamed up with Martin Ragginger. Ragginger supported the team with engineering, data analysis and driver coaching.

In 2015, the Burtin Racing/Bullet Liner team competed in the SCCA TA Trans Am Championship Series with a newly developed Chevrolet Corvette CR.7. Burtin has recently partnered with GoShare, an on-demand local delivery service, for the remainder of the 2016 season.

At the end of the 2020 season, Burtin Racing acquired a 73k square foot facility.

Motorsports Results

SCCA National Championship Runoffs

American Open-Wheel Racing Results

(key) (Races in bold indicate pole position, races in italics indicate fastest race lap)

USAC FF2000 Championship Results

Driver History with Burtin Racing
Jack Baldwin
Martin Ragginger
Mario Farnbacher
Robert Renauer
Nick Tandy
Bryan Sellers
Sebastian Asch
Scott Tucker
Mac McGehee
Mitch Pagerey
Hoosier SCCA Super Tour Race 2 Results

References

External links
Burtin Racing  
Trans-Am

Speedsport Magazine
Racing Sports Cars

1962 births
Living people
20th-century American inventors
21st-century American inventors
Racing drivers from California
Trans-Am Series drivers
U.S. F2000 National Championship drivers
SCCA National Championship Runoffs participants
Argentine racing drivers
24 Hours of Daytona drivers
American chief executives
American patent holders
Argentine American